Panssarikolonna MCD is an album by Sotajumala.

Track listing
 Panssarikolonna (PANZERDIVISION)
 Sodan Kauhu (HORRORS OF WAR)
 Nimettömäksi Jäänyt (LEFT UNNAMED)
 Verimaa, Isänmaa (BLOODLAND, FATHERLAND)

External links
 Official Sotajumala Website

2002 albums
Sotajumala albums